John Moulder-Brown (born 3 June 1953) is an English actor of television and film, known for his appearances in the films Deep End, First Love, Ludwig and The House That Screamed.

Biography 
Moulder-Brown was born in London and began his acting career as a child. In 1982, he acted in George Bernard Shaw's play, Man and Superman, at the Theatre Royal Haymarket in London, alongside Peter O'Toole, Lisa Harrow, James Grout, Michael Byrne, Robert Beatty and Joyce Carey. His next stage appearance was in the play The Table of the Two Horsemen at the Greenwich Theatre, seven years later.

Moulder-Brown founded The Academy of Creative Training, a drama school in Brighton, Sussex, in 1997.

Filmography

Film

Television

References

Bibliography
 Holmstrom, John. The Moving Picture Boy: An International Encyclopaedia from 1895 to 1995. Norwich, Michael Russell, 1996, p. 299-300.

External links 
 

1953 births
Living people
Male actors from London
English male child actors
English male film actors
English male television actors